Yusuf ibn al-Sayrafi (died c. 557/1161) was a historian from Al-Andalus, and secretary of the Almoravid sultan Tashfin ibn Ali (1143–45).

al-Sayrafi was born in Granada.  He wrote a chronicle on the Almoravids, Al-Anwar al-Jalliya fi akhbar al-dawla al-Murabitiyya in which he dealt with the history of al-Andalus and the Maghreb in general and of his native Granada. Almost nothing of this work has survived, but it is quoted by other historians such as Ibn al-Khatib and ibn Idhari (especially in his al-Ihata fi akhbar gharnata).

References

12th-century Moroccan historians
Writers under the Almoravid dynasty
12th-century Arabic writers
People from Granada
Scholars from al-Andalus
12th-century writers from al-Andalus